The Don Juans is an American folk and country music duo comprising Don Henry and Jon Vezner. They accompanied Tom Paxton on his 2018 and 2019 UK tours.

The pair won the 1990 Grammy Award for Best Country Song for their "Where've You Been".

References

External links

American folk musical groups
American country music groups
American musical duos